The year 1905 in science and technology involved some significant events, particularly in physics, listed below.

Astronomy
 January 2 – Charles Dillon Perrine at Lick Observatory discovers Elara, one of the moons of Jupiter. On January 6, the observatory announces its discovery in the previous month of the Jovian moon later known as Himalia.
 The Dominion Observatory opens in Ottawa.
 Various astronomers discover the minor planets 554 Peraga through 583 Klotilde (see List of minor planets/501–600).
 The nova V604 Aquilae appears in the constellation Aquila.
 The Umov effect is noted by Nikolay Umov.

Biology
 April 18 – William Bateson coins the term "genetics" in a letter to Adam Sedgwick.
 June 20 – Dr. Ernest Henry Starling introduces the word "hormone" into the English language. 
 Reginald Punnett's Mendelism is published in Cambridge (U.K.), probably the first popular science book on genetics.
 Frederick Blackman proposes his law of limiting factors in relation to photosynthesis.
 Nettie Stevens and Edmund Beecher Wilson independently describe the XY sex-determination system.
 Stamen Grigorov identifies the bacterium Lactobacillus bulgaricus, a major agent in the creation of yogurt.
 Maltese doctor and archaeologist Themistocles Zammit identifies unpasteurized milk as the major source of the pathogen causing Brucellosis.
 National Association of Audubon Societies for the Protection of Wild Birds and Animals established in the United States.

Chemistry
 Carl von Linde obtains pure liquid oxygen and nitrogen by cooling air.
 Alfred Einhorn synthesises the local anesthetic novocaine.
 The first commercial use of the Frank–Caro process for the nitrogen fixation reaction of calcium carbide and atmospheric nitrogen to produce calcium nitrate as a fertilizer.
 Fritz Haber and Carl Bosch develop the Haber process for making ammonia from its elements, a milestone in industrial chemistry with deep consequences in agriculture.

Mathematics
 Pierre Fatou defines the Mandelbrot set.
 Oswald Veblen proves the Jordan curve theorem.
 Martin Kutta describes the popular fourth-order Runge-Kutta method.
 James Cullen, S.J., begins the study of Cullen numbers.
 Emanuel Lasker proves the Lasker–Noether theorem for the special case of polynomial rings.
 Karl Pearson proposes the random walk in a letter to Nature.

Paleontology
 May 12 – The Natural History Museum, London, unveils its popular exhibit of "Dippy", an exact replica of the skeleton of a Diplodocus carnegii dinosaur.
 The Saurian Expedition led by John C. Merriam recovers many specimens of ichthyosaur.
 Tyrannosaurus rex is described and named by Henry Fairfield Osborn.

Physics
 Albert Einstein (at this time resident in Bern) completes his doctoral thesis, A New Determination of Molecular Dimensions on April 30, submitting it to the University of Zurich on July 30, and publishes his four Annus Mirabilis papers in Annalen der Physik (Leipzig). Because of this, 1905 is said to be the miraculous year for physics, and its 100th anniversary (2005) is declared the World Year of Physics.
 "On a Heuristic Viewpoint Concerning the Production and Transformation of Light", received March 18 and published June 9, explains the photoelectric effect through quantum mechanics.
 "Über die von der molekularkinetischen Theorie der Wärme geforderte Bewegung von in ruhenden Flüssigkeiten suspendierten Teilchen" ("On the Motion of Small Particles Suspended in a Stationary Liquid, as Required by the Molecular Kinetic Theory of Heat"), based on his doctoral research, received May 11 and published July 18, delineates a stochastic model of Brownian motion.
 "On the Electrodynamics of Moving Bodies", received June 30 and published September 26, formulates his theory of special relativity.
 "Does the Inertia of a Body Depend Upon Its Energy Content?", received September 27 and published November 21, deduces the law of mass–energy equivalence, E = mc².

Physiology and medicine
 February 9 – Dr. Prince A. Morrow begins the movement in the United States for sex education with the founding of the Society of Sanitary and Moral Prophylaxis.
 Nikolai Korotkov first describes auscultatory blood pressure measurement.
 Karl Landsteiner first describes Meconium ileus.
 Fritz Schaudinn and Erich Hoffmann discover the bacterium that is responsible for syphilis, a spiral-shaped spirochete called Treponema pallidum.

Psychology
 Sigmund Freud publishes Drei Abhandlungen zur Sexualtheorie (Three Essays on the Theory of Sexuality) and Der Witz und seine Beziehung zum Unbewußten (Jokes and their Relation to the Unconscious).
 June – Alfred Binet and Théodore Simon publish the first Binet-Simon Intelligence Test for intelligence testing of children with mental retardation.

Technology
 January 17 – Samuel J. Bens of San Francisco is granted the earliest patent for a practical "endless chain saw" for felling trees.
 Pathé Frères colorise black-and-white films by machine.
 Alfred Buchi files a patent for the turbocharger.
 Paul de Vivie invents a two-speed rear-wheel derailleur gear for bicycles.
 Pipe manufactures the first automobile with a hemi engine.
 Walter Griffiths invents a manually powered domestic vacuum cleaner.
 Reginald Fessenden invents the superheterodyne receiver.
 Marconi invents the directional antenna.
 First bascule bridge to the design of Joseph Strauss built.
 Canal Lake Concrete Arch Bridge built in Ontario.

Awards
 Nobel Prizes
 Physics – Philipp Eduard Anton von Lenard
 Chemistry – Johann Friedrich Wilhelm Adolf von Baeyer
 Medicine – Robert Koch

Births
 February 1 – Emilio Segrè (died 1989), Italian-born physicist, Nobel laureate
 February 17 – Rózsa Péter (died 1977), Hungarian mathematician, "founding mother of recursive function theory"
 February 23 – Derrick Henry Lehmer (died 1991), American mathematician
 March 18 – Thomas Townsend Brown (died 1985), American inventor
 March 26 – Viktor Frankl (died 1997), Austrian psychotherapist
 March 27 – Elsie MacGill (died 1980), Canadian aeronautical engineer, "Queen of the Hurricanes"
 April 13 – Bruno Rossi (died 1993), Italian physicist and astronomer
 April 18 – George H. Hitchings (died 1998), American scientist, Nobel laureate in Medicine
 April 20 – Albrecht Unsöld (died 1995), German astronomer
 July 7 – Marie-Louise Dubreil-Jacotin (died 1972), French mathematician
 August 1 – Helen Sawyer Hogg (died 1993), American-born astronomer
 August 11 – Erwin Chargaff (died 2002), Austro-Hungarian-born biochemist
 August 16 – Marian Rejewski (died 1980), Polish mathematician and cryptologist
 August 31 – Robert Bacher (died 2004), American nuclear physicist
 September 3 – Carl David Anderson (died 1991), American physicist, Nobel laureate
 September 17 – Hans Freudenthal (died 1990), American mathematician
 September 22 – Eugen Sänger (died 1964), Austrian-born aerospace engineer
 September 24 – Severo Ochoa (died 1993), Spanish biochemist, Nobel laureate
 September 30 – Nevill Francis Mott (died 1996), English physicist, Nobel laureate
 October 15 – C. P. Snow (died 1980), English physicist and novelist
 October 22
 Karl Guthe Jansky (died 1950), American physicist
 Felix Bloch (died 1983), Swiss physicist, Nobel laureate
 October 31 – Harry Harlow (died 1981), American psychologist
 November 10 – Louis Harold Gray (died 1965), English physicist, inventor of the field of radiobiology
 December 7 – Gerard Kuiper (died 1973), Dutch-born astronomer
 December 16 – Piet Hein (died 1996), Danish mathematician
 December 22 – Tommy Flowers (died 1998), English computer engineer

Deaths
 January 4 – Paul Henry (born 1848), French astronomer
 January 14 – Ernst Abbe (born 1840), German physicist
 March 24 – Jules Verne (born 1828), French science fiction author
 April 14 – Otto Wilhelm von Struve (born 1819), Russian astronomer
 June 18 – Per Teodor Cleve (born 1840), Swedish chemist
 August 20 – Franz Reuleaux (born 1829), German mechanical engineer
 September 19 – Thomas Barnardo (born 1845), Irish-born physician and philanthropist
 October 6 – Ferdinand von Richthofen (born 1833), German geologist
 November 14 – Robert Whitehead (born 1823), English marine engineer
 November 15 (O.S. November 2) – Ivan Sechenov (born 1829), "the father of Russian physiology"

References

 
Science, 1905 In
20th century in science
1900s in science